Saddle Ridge is a residential neighbourhood in the northeast quadrant of Calgary, Alberta. It is located at the northeastern edge of the city, and it is bounded to the north by Airport Trail NE, to the east by Stoney Trail NE (Highway 201), to the south by 80 Avenue NE and to the west by Métis Trail. The Saddle Ridge Industrial Area and Calgary International Airport are located west of the neighbourhood.

The Saddletowne Ctrain was built in 2012, and is the end of line for Northeast. The Ctrain station is located across a plaza that serves many South Asian restaurants as well as Nelson Mandela High School, and YMCA. Saddle Ridge is the largest neighbourhood for its Indian, Pakistani, Punjabi, and small Bengali community. The Bilal Islamic Centre was recently opened up in 2021, and has attracted many Muslims in the Northeast. 

The community initially consisted of acreages, with an active community association since the 1970s; intended urbanization was supposed to begin in the 1990s, however, due to drainage, it was pushed to the 2000s. In the mid 2000s, urbanization of the region began and, today, Saddle Ridge primarily refers to the urban community that has developed around the commercial hub formed by Saddletowne Circle, although a number of acreages remain. The western portion of the area is called Saddle Ridge Industrial and has started its construction in late 2018. Savanna, a division of the neighbourhood, is currently being built as part of the final expansion to Saddleridge for its full urban completion. Beside Savanna and 68th Street will be the Savanna Bazaar, an outdoor commercial market place that serves South Asian and Southeast Asian needs and food. Construction of Savanna began in 2017 and is still ongoing, while the first phase of the Savanna Bazaar is expected for completion in summer 2019.

It is represented in the Calgary City Council by the Ward 5 councillor.

Demographics

Residents in this community had a median household income of $71,101 in 2005, and there were 12.9% low income residents living in the neighbourhood. As of 2006, 47.0% of the residents were immigrants. A proportion of 1.3% of the buildings were apartments and 3.5% of the housing was used for renting.

Education
Saddle Ridge Elementary School serves students, the school accommodates Kindergarten to Grade 4 students residing in Saddle Ridge. Alongside Saddle Ridge Elementary school, recently opened Hugh A Bennett School providing Kindergarten to Grade 4 students. Peter Lougheed Junior High School also recently opened in Saddle Ridge. Students who’ve competed Kindergarten - Grade 4 are later welcomed to Peter Lougheed. Welcoming students from Grade 5 - Grade 9, Nelson Mandela the high school of students who live in the community of Saddle Ridge.

The Calgary Catholic School Board houses one school, Light of Christ, in the Saddleridge area, it was the first school to open in the community. It is located in Saddlehorn and welcomes those from Kindergarten to Grade 9.

See also
List of neighbourhoods in Calgary

References

External links
Saddle Ridge Community Association

Neighbourhoods in Calgary